The United States House of Representatives elections in California, 1872 was an election for California's delegation to the United States House of Representatives, which occurred as part of the general election of the House of Representatives on November 5, 1872. California gained one seat as a result of the 1870 Census, which the Republicans won. The Democrats, however, gained a Republican-held district. (Note: The Democratic candidates here ran under the label "Liberal Republican".)

Overview

Delegation Composition

Results
Final results from the Clerk of the House of Representatives:

District 1

District 2

District 3

District 4

See also
43rd United States Congress
Political party strength in California
Political party strength in U.S. states
United States House of Representatives elections, 1872

References
California Elections Page
Office of the Clerk of the House of Representatives

External links
California Legislative District Maps (1911-Present)
RAND California Election Returns: District Definitions

1872
United States House of Representatives
California